Lertchai Issarasuwipakorn (Thai เลิศชาย อิสราสุวิภากร), 1982 in Khon Kaen, Thailand) is a Thai futsal Defender.

He competed for Thailand at the 2004 and 2008 FIFA Futsal World Cup finals.

References

Lertchai Issarasuwipakorn
1982 births
Living people
Lertchai Issarasuwipakorn
Southeast Asian Games medalists in futsal
Competitors at the 2011 Southeast Asian Games
Thai expatriate sportspeople in Japan
Lertchai Issarasuwipakorn
Lertchai Issarasuwipakorn